The Mixed Doubles tournament of the 2011 BWF World Junior Championships is a badminton world junior individual championships for the Eye Level Cups, held on November 2–6. The defending champion of the last edition is Liu Cheng / Bao Yixin from China. Indonesian pair Alfian Eko Prasetya and Gloria Emanuelle Widjaja won the gold medal after beat their compatriot Ronald Alexander and Tiara Rosalia Nuraidah in the final round with the score 12–21, 21–17, and 25–23.

Seeds 
The seeds  based from the Continental Confederation's recommendation, players performance at the Suhandinata Cup and also using the latest world ranking  as a guideline.

  Lukhi Apri Nugroho / Ririn Amelia (third round)
  Wannawat Ampunsuwan / Chonthicha Kittiharakul (quarter-final)
  Nelson Heg / Chow Mei Kuan (semi-final)
  Jim Middleburg / Soraya de Visch Eibergen (fourth round)
  Anatoliy Yartsev / Evgeniya Kosetskaya (fourth round)
  Huang Po-jui / Wu Ti-jung (fourth round)
  Joris Grosjean / Lea Palermo (fourth round)
  Frederik Colberg / Mette Poulsen (fourth round)
  Hafiz Faizal / Shella Devi Aulia (fourth round)
  Kasper Antonsen / Line Kjærsfeldt (quarter-final)
  Lee Hong-je / Shin Seung-chan (quarter-final)
  Gaetan Mittelheisser / Lorraine Baumann (second round)
  Russell Muns / Myke Halkema (fourth round)
  Calvin Ong Jia Hong / Lee Meng Yean (third round)
  Wang Chih-hao / Chen Pai-jou (third round)
  Ronald Alexander / Tiara Rosalia Nuraidah (final)

Draw

Finals

Top Half

Section 1

Section 2

Section 3

Section 4

Bottom Half

Section 5

Section 6

Section 7

Section 8

References

External links
Main Draw

2011 BWF World Junior Championships